Laminacauda diffusa is a species of sheet weaver found in Chile, Argentina and the Falkland Islands. It was described by Millidge in 1985.

References

Linyphiidae
Spiders described in 1985
Spiders of South America